Geoff Everett is an English musician, leading band band member and solo artist mainly playing blues music.

Early years

1970s–1980s

1990s to present day
Also in 2015 the song "Bad Bad Man" from the album "The Quick and The Dead" was included on the Sci-Fi Horror film Tremors 5: Bloodlines released by Universal Studios. The song is used as incidental music.

Associations
Everett appeared in the line up of Screaming Lord Sutch and the Savages (after the departure of Jeff Beck and Jimmy Page).

Collaborations
He wrote the song "Satellite Blues" for the Rhythm and Blues band Nine Below Zero's album Off The Hook (1992).

References

External links
 Geoff Everett webpage
 

English rock guitarists
living people
Screaming Lord Sutch and the Savages members
year of birth missing (living people)